The canton of Le Val de Thouet is an administrative division of the Deux-Sèvres department, western France. It was created at the French canton reorganisation which came into effect in March 2015. Its seat is in Airvault.

It consists of the following communes:
 
Airvault
Assais-les-Jumeaux
Availles-Thouarsais
Boussais
Brion-près-Thouet
Le Chillou
Coulonges-Thouarsais
Glénay
Irais
Loretz-d'Argenton
Louin
Luché-Thouarsais
Luzay
Maisontiers
Marnes
Pas-de-Jeu
Pierrefitte
Plaine-et-Vallées
Saint-Cyr-la-Lande
Sainte-Gemme
Saint-Généroux
Saint-Léger-de-Montbrun
Saint-Loup-Lamairé
Saint-Martin-de-Mâcon
Saint-Martin-de-Sanzay
Saint-Varent
Tessonnière
Tourtenay
Val en Vignes

References

Cantons of Deux-Sèvres